Dom Otdykha 40 let Oktyabrya is a rural locality (a settlement) in Nizhnechirskoye Rural Settlement, Surovikinsky District, Volgograd Oblast, Russia. The population was 10 as of 2010.

Geography 
The settlement is located 57 km southeast of Surovikino (the district's administrative centre) by road. Suvorovskaya is the nearest rural locality.

References 

Rural localities in Surovikinsky District